Moulin Rouge! Music from Baz Luhrmann's Film is the soundtrack album to Baz Luhrmann's 2001 film Moulin Rouge!, released on 8 May 2001 by Interscope Records. The album features most of the songs featured in the film. However, some of the songs are alternate versions and there are two or three major songs that are left off. The original film versions and extra songs were featured on the second soundtrack.

Songs
The soundtrack consists almost entirely of cover versions—"Come What May", composed by David Baerwald and Kevin Gilbert, is the only original song on the album. The opening track, "Nature Boy", is performed by David Bowie, though in the film the song is performed by actor John Leguizamo as the character Henri de Toulouse-Lautrec. Originally by American singer-songwriter eden ahbez, the song is reprised as the last song on the soundtrack with performances by Bowie and Massive Attack, along with a dialogue by Nicole Kidman.

"Lady Marmalade", written by Bob Crewe and Kenny Nolan, was made famous in the 1970s by the girl group Labelle. The song contains the sexually suggestive lyric "Voulez-vous coucher avec moi, ce soir?", which translates to "Do you want to sleep with me tonight?" Labelle's version of the song was inducted into the Grammy Hall of Fame in 2003. The version for the soundtrack is performed by Christina Aguilera, Lil' Kim, Mýa, and Pink, with production and additional vocal credits by Missy Elliott. The song topped the Billboard Hot 100 in the United States and earned a Grammy Award for Best Pop Collaboration with Vocals.

"Because We Can" is credited to Norman Cook, with performance and production credits given to his stage name Fatboy Slim. The song contains portions of "Zidler's Rap", performed in the film by Jim Broadbent as the character Harold Zidler, and has been called the "'Can Can' for the next generation". "Sparkling Diamonds" is performed by Kidman, Broadbent, Caroline O'Connor, Natalie Mendoza and Lara Mulcahy. The song is a medley featuring "Diamonds Are a Girl's Best Friend", written by Jule Styne and Leo Robin and introduced by Carol Channing in the Broadway production of Gentlemen Prefer Blondes (1949), and "Material Girl" by Madonna. "Rhythm of the Night" was made famous in 1985 by the American R&B group DeBarge. The track reached number one on the Billboard Hot R&B chart and number three on the Billboard Hot 100, and is said to have "jumpstarted" the career of songwriter Diane Warren. The soundtrack version is performed by Valeria, and includes a dialogue by Kidman.

Commercial performance
Moulin Rouge! Music from Baz Luhrmann's Film debuted on the US Billboard 200 at number five on 16 May 2001. Four weeks later, the album reach its peak position at number three. The soundtrack reached number one on the Top Soundtracks chart and number 33 on the Top Pop Catalog chart. On 23 April 2002, it was certified double platinum by the Recording Industry Association of America (RIAA).

In Australia, the soundtrack debuted on the albums chart at number four on 11 May 2001. The following week, it reached number one and remained there for 11 consecutive weeks and upon the albums chart for 58 weeks. It was the highest-selling album of 2001 in Australia and has been certified five-times platinum by the Australian Recording Industry Association (ARIA). Moulin Rouge! Music from Baz Luhrmann's Film also reached number one in New Zealand, where it remained on the albums chart for 16 weeks. The soundtrack reached the top five in Austria, Denmark, France, and Norway. In 2001 the album was the 20th best-selling album globally, selling 4 million copies

Track listing

Notes
  signifies a vocal producer
  signifies an additional vocal producer
  signifies an orchestral producer
  signifies a main producer, additional producer and remixer
  signifies a remixer

Personnel

 Josh G. Abrahams – producer (1, 4–6, 8, 10, 12)
 Pink – performer (2)
 Christina Aguilera – performer (2)
 Jamie Allen – performer (10)
 Valeria Andrews – performer (5)
 Craig Armstrong – producer (1, 4, 6, 8, 10, 12, 15), orchestra production (11), arranger (6, 8, 10, 12)
 John "Beetle" Bailey – assistant engineer
 Chris Barrett – assistant engineer
 Beck – performer (9)
 BLAM – producer (1, 4–6, 8, 10, 12, 14)
 Bono – guitar (7), arranger (7), performer (7), producer (7)
 David Bowie – performer (1, 15)
 Andy Bradfield – mixing (1, 6, 8, 12, 14)
 Jim Broadbent – performer (3–4)
 Neil Davidge – mixing (15), producer (15)
 Marius de Vries – vocal producer (3–6, 8, 10–12, 14), music direction
 Robert "3D" Del Naja – mixing (15), producer (15)
 Jimmy Douglas – engineer (9), mixing (9)
 Dylan Dresdow – engineer (2)
 Felipe Elgueta – engineer (11)
 Chris Elliott – arranger (10, 12), conductor
 Missy Elliott – producer (2), vocals (2)
 Ron Fair – vocal producer (2)
 Fatboy Slim – performer (3), producer (3)
 José Feliciano – performer (12)
 David Foster – producer (11)
 Geoff Foster – engineer (1, 4–6, 8, 10–12, 14)
 Simon Franglen – engineer (4–6, 8, 10–12, 14), vocal production assistance (4–6, 8, 10, 12, 14), producer (11)
 Ryan Freeland – mixing (5)
 Gavin Friday – arranger (7), producer (7), performer (7)
 Julian Gallagher – keyboards (7), producer (7)
 Humberto Gatica – mixing (11)
 Ricky Graham – assistant engineer
 Isobel Griffiths – orchestra contractor
 Brad Haehnel – mixing (4,10)
 Ash Howes – programming (7), engineer (7)
 Jake Jackson – assistant engineer
 Nicole Kidman – performer (4, 8, 10–11, 14), dialogue (5, 15)
 Michael Knobloch – music production supervisor
 Jacek Koman – performer (12)
 Robert Kraft – executive in charge of music
 Joe Leguabe – performer
 Patrick Leonard – producer (6)
 Lil' Kim – performer (2)
 John Leguizamo – performer (14)
 Baz Luhrmann – producer (12)
 Massive Attack – performer (15)
 Ewan McGregor – dialogue (1), performer (6, 10–12)
 Natalie Mendoza – performer (4)
 Anton Monsted – music supervisor, executive music producer
 Lara Mulcahy – performer (4)
 Don Murnaghan – engineer (13)
 Mýa – performer (2)
 Andy Nelson – mixing (10)
 Caroline O'Connor – performer (4)
 Jennie O'Grady – choir master
 Ozzy Osbourne – performer
 Dave Pensado – mixing (2)
 Michel Pepin – engineer (13), mixing (13), producer (13)
 Mickey Petralia – engineer (9)
 Dave Reitzas – engineer (11)
 Carmen Rizzo – engineer
 Michael C. Ross – engineer (2)
 Alessandro Safina – performer (6)
 Steve Sharples – arranger (14), producer (14)
 Eddy Schreyer – mastering
 Maurice Seezer – guitar (7), arranger (7), keyboards (7), programming (7), producer (7), engineer (7), performer (7)
 Steve Sidwell – arranger (4), horn arrangements (5)
 Alexis Smith – producer (5)
 Brian Springer – engineer (2)
 Richard Stannard – guitar (7), keyboards (7), producer (7)
 Alvin Sweeney – engineer (7)
 Timbaland – producer (9), mixing (9)
 Simon Thornton – engineer (3)
 Tony Visconti – vocals (1)
 Rufus Wainwright – performer (13), producer (13)
 Gavyn Wright – orchestra leader
 Alka Yagnik – performer (14)
 Laura Ziffren – music supervisor, executive music producer
 Joel Zifkin – violin (13)

Charts

Weekly charts

Year-end charts

Decade-end charts

Certifications and sales

Release history

References

2000s film soundtrack albums
2001 soundtrack albums
Albums produced by Richard Stannard (songwriter)
Albums produced by Bono
Albums produced by David Foster
Albums produced by Josh Abraham
Albums produced by Missy Elliott
Albums produced by Neil Davidge
Albums produced by Patrick Leonard
Albums produced by Rockwilder
Albums produced by Timbaland
Drama film soundtracks
Interscope Records soundtracks
Moulin Rouge!
Musical film soundtracks
Romance film soundtracks